Jurich Christopher Alexander Carolina (born 15 July 1998) is a Curaçaoan professional footballer who plays as a left-back for Polish club Miedź Legnica and the Curaçao national football team.

Club career
Carolina made his debut for Eerste Divisie side Jong PSV in 2015. In the 2015–16 season, he joined PSV. He played for AZ before he moved to Eindhoven.

International career
Carolina is a former youth international for the Netherlands at the U17, and  U19 levels. He made his international debut for the Curaçao national team in a 1–1 friendly tie with Bolivia on 23 March 2018.

Career statistics
Scores and results list Curaçao's goal tally first, score column indicates score after each Carolina goal.

Honours
Miedź Legnica
I liga: 2021–22

Curaçao
 King's Cup: 2019

References

External links
 
 Jurich Carolina page at official PSV site

Honours

1997 births
Living people
People from Willemstad
Curaçao footballers
Curaçao expatriate footballers
Curaçao international footballers
Dutch footballers
Dutch expatriate footballers
Netherlands youth international footballers
Dutch people of Curaçao descent
Association football defenders
2019 CONCACAF Gold Cup players
Fortuna Sittard players
AZ Alkmaar players
Jong PSV players
NAC Breda players
FC Den Bosch players
OKS Stomil Olsztyn players
Miedź Legnica players
Eredivisie players
Eerste Divisie players
Ekstraklasa players
I liga players
III liga players
Expatriate footballers in Poland
Curaçao expatriate sportspeople in Poland
Dutch expatriate sportspeople in Poland